Bathyphytophilidae is a family of very small deepwater sea snails or false limpets, marine gastropod mollusks in the clade Vetigastropoda (according to the taxonomy of the Gastropoda by Bouchet & Rocroi, 2005).

This family has no subfamilies.

Genera 
Genera within the family Bathyphytophilidae include: 
 Aenigmabonus Moskalev, 1978
 Bathyphytophilus Moskalev, 1978, the type genus

References 

 AnimalDiversityWeb info at: